Irina Vladimirovna Karpova (née Naumenko, ; born 13 February 1980 in Kamenogorsk, East Kazakhstan Region) is a Kazakhstani heptathlete.

Naumenko was 2nd at the Hexham International Combined Events Meeting in 2005 (5438pts)

She married Dmitriy Karpov, a decathlete. The pair has two children (born 2009 and 2010).

Achievements

Personal bests
200 metres – 24.64 (Almaty 2000)
800 metres – 2:12.37 (Jakarta 2000)
100 metres hurdles – 13.96 (+0.3 m/s) (Götzis 2004)
High jump – 1.88 (Almaty 2000)
Long jump – 6.35 (+1.5 m/s) (Bishkek 2000)
Shot put – 13.90 (Almaty 2012)
Javelin throw – 43.19 (Almaty 2012)
Heptathlon – 6140 (Almaty 2003)
Decathlon – 7798 (Talence 2004)

References

External links
 
 

1980 births
Living people
Kazakhstani heptathletes
Athletes (track and field) at the 2000 Summer Olympics
Athletes (track and field) at the 2004 Summer Olympics
Athletes (track and field) at the 2008 Summer Olympics
Athletes (track and field) at the 2012 Summer Olympics
Olympic athletes of Kazakhstan
Kazakhstani people of Russian descent
Athletes (track and field) at the 2006 Asian Games
Asian Games competitors for Kazakhstan
People from East Kazakhstan Region
21st-century Kazakhstani people